The 1929–30 Drexel Dragons men's basketball team represented Drexel Institute of Art, Science and Industry during the 1929–30 men's basketball season. The Dragons, led by 3rd year head coach Walter Halas, played their home games at Curtis Hall Gym.

Roster

Schedule

|-
!colspan=9 style="background:#F8B800; color:#002663;"| Regular season
|-

References

Drexel Dragons men's basketball seasons
Drexel
1929 in sports in Pennsylvania
1930 in sports in Pennsylvania